George Merlyn Anthony (April 26, 1926 – February 2, 1993) was an American professional baseball umpire who worked in the American League from 1969 to 1975. Anthony umpired the 1974 Major League Baseball All-Star Game and the 1973 American League Championship Series. In his career, he umpired 965 Major League games. Before his umpiring career, he was a Minor League Baseball player in 1946 and 1948.  During the 1950s Merle played second base for his hometown Marysville Giants and the Yuba-Sutter Rebels where he gave younger players tips on how to improve their skills.  His nickname was "Rabbit."

Early career
Anthony had a brief minor league career as a player in the 1940s and 1950s. He returned to the minor leagues as an umpire between 1960 and 1969. During that period, Anthony umpired in the California League and the Pacific Coast League before receiving the nod to work in the major leagues.

MLB career

Notable games
As a home plate umpire on July 9, 1971, Anthony was involved in two arguments with Tony Conigliaro that preceded Conigliaro's retirement the next day. The first ensued when Conigliaro swung at a dropped third strike. The slugger ran to first base, but Anthony called him out per baseball rules, as there was already a runner occupying first base. In the 19th inning, Conigliaro was called out on strikes while attempting to bunt. Conigliaro tossed his helmet in the air and hit it with his bat. The player was ejected by one of Anthony's crew members, George Maloney.

Anthony was also one of the first three umpires, along with Don Denkinger and Dave Phillips, to switch to the inside chest protector, which American League umpires were allowed to use beginning in the 1975 season.

Personal life
Anthony was married to the former Virginia Luggar. He was sales manager of the local Plymouth dealer during the 1950s.

See also 

 List of Major League Baseball umpires

References

External links
 Umpire Card

1926 births
1993 deaths
Major League Baseball umpires
Sportspeople from Greater Sacramento
Baseball people from California
Ogdensburg Maples players
Pawtucket Slaters players
Eau Claire Bears players
People from Marysville, California